TS Podbeskidzie Bielsko-Biała is a football club based in Bielsko-Biała, Poland. They currently compete in the I liga, the second tier of Polish football.

History 

The club was essentially founded on 11 July 1997, although it can trace its roots back to 1907. That year Bielitzer Fussball Klub (FK Bielitz) was established, in the town of Bielitz, Austria-Hungary, then dominated by ethnic Germans and so was the club. In 1911, the club was renamed to Bielitz-Bialaer Sport Verein (BBSV). Since 1920, the town, known henceforth as Bielsko, belonged to Poland, after the country regained independence. In 1936, the club changed its German name to Polish Bielsko-Bialskie Towarzystwo Sportowe Bielsko (BBTS Bielsko). In 1968, it was merged with KS Włókniarz (founded in 1911). The third ancestor, DKS Komorowice, was founded in 1995. Said clubs were merged altogether in 1997 to form TS Podbeskidzie Bielsko-Biała. From 2011 to 2016 the club performed in the top Polish football league, the Ekstraklasa, promoted as the first club from the city, before being relegated to the I liga.

They competed in the Ekstraklasa again, following their 2019–20 promotion. After the season they were relegated back to the second-tier I liga.

Honours 
 I liga
 Runners-up: 2010–11, 2019–20

Current squad

Out on loan

Staff

Managers 

 Zdzisław Byrdy (1997)
 Bogdan Warzecha (1997)
 Zdeněk Dembinný (1997–98)
 Wojciech Borecki (1 January 1999 – 16 June 2001)
 Albin Wira (1 July 2001 – 31 December 2001)
 Wojciech Borecki (29 August 2001 – 31 December 2002)
 Paweł Kowalski (2003)
 Wojciech Borecki (11 June 2003 – 15 October 2003)
 Krzysztof Pawlak (15 October 2003 – 1 July 2004)
 Jan Żurek (1 July 2004 – 23 August 2005)
 Włodzimierz Małowiejski (23 August 2005 – 24 April 2006)
 Krzysztof Tochel (2006–07)
 Marcin Brosz (1 July 2007 – 2 November 2009)
 Tomasz Świderski (2 November 2009 – 3 December 2009)
 Robert Kasperczyk (4 December 2009 – 22 October 2012)
 Andrzej Wyroba (caretaker) (22 October 2012 – 29 October 2012)
 Marcin Sasal (29 October 2012 – 3 January 2013)
 Dariusz Kubicki (4 January 2013 – 20 March 2013)
 Czesław Michniewicz (22 March 2013 – 22 October 2013)
 Leszek Ojrzyński (23 October 2013– 30 April 2015)
 Dariusz Kubicki (4 May 2015 – 19 September 2015)
 Robert Podoliński (20 September 2015 – 19 May 2016)
 Dariusz Dźwigała (7 June 2016 – 11 October 2016)
 Ján Kocian (11 October 2016 - 7 October 2017)
 Adam Nocoń (7 October 2017 – 13 June 2018)
 Krzysztof Brede (18 June 2018 – 15 December 2020)
 Robert Kasperczyk (22 December 2020 – 25 May 2021)
 Piotr Jawny (14 June 2021 – 26 April 2022)
 Mirosław Smyła (26 April 2022 – 31 August 2022)
 Dariusz Kołodziej (caretaker) (31 August 2022 – 6 September 2022)
 Dariusz Żuraw (6 September 2022 – )

See also 
 Football in Poland
 List of football teams

References

External links 

  
 Profile on 90minut.pl 

 
Sport in Bielsko-Biała
Football clubs in Silesian Voivodeship
Association football clubs established in 1997
1997 establishments in Poland